Frumenta nephelomicta is a moth in the family Gelechiidae. It was described by Edward Meyrick in 1930. It is found in North America, where it has been recorded from New Mexico and Texas.

The wingspan is about 24 mm. The forewings are white, irregularly irrorated (sprinkled) with light ochreous grey and with the discal stigmata forming small greyish spots, a subtriangular blotch of light grey suffusion resting on the fold between these. The costal edge is suffused with grey on the median third and there is an angulated white subterminal shade clear of greyish irroration. The posterior part of the costa and termen is obscurely spotted greyish. The hindwings are light grey.

References

Gnorimoschemini
Moths described in 1930